Niwaka or FITSAT-1 is a 1U CubeSat satellite deployed from the International Space Station (ISS) on 4 October 2012. The Niwaka satellite includes high power LEDs which are driven by 200 watts pulses, allowing Morse code style communication from the sky to the ground. FITSAT-1 (Niwaka) communicates with ground by means of 5.8 GHz high-speed (115200 bit/s) transmitter. It also has a 437 MHz (amateur band) beacon and transmitter with data rate 1200 bit/s for telemetry downlink.

The name Niwaka derives from "Hakata Niwaka", which is traditional impromptu comical talking with masks. It is also the old name of the city Fukuoka, site of the Fukuoka Institute of Technology in Japan which created the satellite.

WE WISH, RAIKO, FITSAT-1, F-1, and TechEdSat-1 travelled to orbit aboard Kounotori 3 (HTV-3).

It reentered in the atmosphere of Earth on 4 July 2013.

Launch

See also 

 2012 in spaceflight
 Ginrei - another LED satellite (2014)

References

External links 
 FITSAT-1 (Niwaka) log 

Spacecraft which reentered in 2013
CubeSats
Spacecraft launched in 2012
Satellites deployed from the International Space Station